Þorgils Óttar Mathiesen (born 17 May 1962) is an Icelandic former handball player who competed in the 1984 Summer Olympics and in the 1988 Summer Olympics.

References

1962 births
Living people
Thorgils Mathiesen
Thorgils Mathiesen
Handball players at the 1984 Summer Olympics
Handball players at the 1988 Summer Olympics